Southerly Magazine is an independent, non-profit American media organization and magazine focusing on justice, equality, and culture in the American South. The magazine was founded by Lyndsey Gilpin, who hoped that the magazine would fill in the gaps in a region vastly underserved in environmental reporting and storytelling. They are sponsored by the  Institute for Journalism and Natural Resources (IJNR).

In 2018, Southerly spoke with activist Pamela Rush about poverty in rural Alabama.

References

Cultural magazines published in the United States
Magazines of the Southern United States